Anna Guðrún Jónasdóttir (born 2 December 1942) is an Icelandic political scientist and gender studies academic. She is Professor Emerita at the Center for Feminist Social Studies at Örebro University and co-director of the GEXcel International Collegium for Advanced Transdisciplinary Gender Studies, established as a centre of excellence in gender studies in 2006. She is the author and editor of several books. Anna Jónasdóttir is known, i.a., for her theory of "love power." Her book Why Women Are Oppressed was described as a "thorough attempt to revitalize one of the most provocative early themes of America's women's liberation movement" by The New York Times Book Review. She "explores the concept of women's interests in participatory democratic political theory."

She has a background in political science, sociology, economic history and psychology, with a doctorate in political science from Gothenburg University (1991). Her dissertation was titled Love Power and Political Interests. Her main fields of research are social and political theory.

Selected books
 
  Published in Spanish under the title 
  
 
  Pdf version.

Literature

References

1942 births
21st-century Icelandic philosophers
Anna G. Jonasdottir
Anna G. Jonasdottir
Feminist philosophers
Women's studies academics
Living people
University of Gothenburg alumni
Feminist theorists
Critical theorists
Academic staff of Örebro University
Anna G. Jonasdottir
Anna G. Jonasdottir
20th-century Icelandic philosophers